Dmitriyevskoye is a rural locality (a village) in Spasskoye Rural Settlement, Vologodsky District, Vologda Oblast, Russia. The population was 4 as of 2002.

Geography 
The distance to Vologda is 11 km, to Nepotyagovo is 1 km. Avdotyino, Nepotyagovo, Pilatovo, Ivanovskoye are the nearest rural localities.

References 

Rural localities in Vologodsky District